The Women's 50 metre backstroke competition of the 2018 European Aquatics Championships was held on 4 and 5 August 2018.

Records
Prior to the competition, the existing world and championship records were as follows.

The following new records were set during this competition.

Results

Heats
The heats were started on 4 August at 10:17.

Semifinals
The semifinals were held on 4 August at 17:49.

Semifinal 1

Semifinal 2

Final
The final was held on 5 August at 18:21.

References

Women's 50 metre backstroke